Kofi is a masculine given name of the Akan people of Ghana. 

Kofi may also refer to:

Surname
 Ellia Kofi Junior (born 2004), Ghanaian footballer
 Laura Adorkor Kofi (died 1928), Ghanaian minister and activist
 Osei Kofi (born 1940), Ghanaian retired footballer
 Tony Kofi (born 1966), British jazz musician
 Rene Osei Kofi (born 1991), Ghanaian-Dutch footballer
 Vincent Kofi (1923–1974), Ghanaian artist and academic

Stage or ring name
 Kofi (musician), British lovers rock singer Carol Simms
 Kofi B, stage name of Ghanaian highlife musician Kofi Boakye Yiadom (died 2020)
 Kofi Kingston, ring name of Ghanaian professional wrestler Kofi Sarkodie-Mensah

Other uses
Kofi (album), a 1995 album by jazz trumpeter Donald Byrd
KOFI, an AM radio station licensed to serve Kalispell, Montana, United States